High on You is the first solo album by singer/songwriter/multi-instrumentalist Sly Stone, released by Epic/CBS Records in 1975. The Family Stone broke up in January 1975 after a disastrous booking at the Radio City Music Hall. At this point, most of the band members parted company with Stone, except for trumpeter Cynthia Robinson, his brother guitarist Freddie Stone, and backup singers Little Sister. With subsequent recordings, Stone returned to using the name of his former band, although they were largely solo recordings.

Overview
Stone performed a large part of the instrumentation for each song on his own using multitracking (as he had been doing for Family Stone LPs since There's a Riot Goin' On in 1971). This album includes a combination of newly recorded solo material with a handful of songs recorded before the Family Stone's dissolution.

High on You's first single was the R&B number-three hit "I Get High on You". The LP's second single, "Le Lo Li", failed to chart within the R&B Top 40, as did the third, "Crossword Puzzle". All three singles missed the U.S. pop Top 40.

Besides its standard stereo release, High on You was also released in quadraphonic sound.

Track listing
All songs written by Sylvester Stewart and produced by Sly Stone, unless otherwise noted.

Side one
"I Get High On You" - 3:15
"Crossword Puzzle" - 2:57
"That's Lovin' You" - 2:58
"Who Do You Love?" - 3:42
"Green Eyed Monster Girl" - 3:55

Side two
"Organize" (Sylvester Stewart, Freddie Stewart) - 3:22
"Le Lo Li" - 3:20
"My World" - 3:26
"So Good To Me" - 3:24
"Greed" - 4:13

Personnel
Sly Stone - vocals, keyboards, guitar, bass, various instruments
Little Sister (Dawn Silva, Tiny Melton, Vet Stewart, Rudy Love) - background vocals
Freddie Stone - vocals, guitar
Jerry Martini - saxophones
Dennis Marcellino - saxophone
Cousin Gale (Gail Muldrow) - guitar
Bobby Vega - bass on "I Get High on You"
Rusty Allen - bass on "Organize"
Michael Samuels - drums on "Crossword Puzzle" and "Monster Girl"
Jim Strassburg - drums on "I Get High on You", "Who Do You Love", "My World", "So Good to Me" and "Greed"
Willie Wild Sparks - drums on "Le Lo Li"
Bill Lordan - drums on "That's Lovin' You"
Cynthia Robinson - trumpet, vocals
"Little Moses" - organ on "I Get High On You"
Bobby Lyles, Tricky Truman Governor (Truman Thomas) - keyboards
Sid Page - violin
Technical
Karat Faye - engineer

References

1975 albums
Sly and the Family Stone albums
Albums produced by Sly Stone
Epic Records albums